is a 1930 Japanese silent film directed by Heinosuke Gosho, starring Kinuyo Tanaka and Ichirō Yuki.

Cast
Kinuyo Tanaka
Ichirō Yuki
Kikuko Hanaoka
Jun Arai
Kimiko Hikari
Hikaru Yamanouchi

Notes

References

External links

1930 films
1930 drama films
Japanese drama films
Japanese black-and-white films
Japanese silent films
Films directed by Heinosuke Gosho
Silent drama films
1930s Japanese-language films